Azim Azami Mohd Ariffin is a Malaysian international lawn bowler.

Bowls career
Ariffin won the bronze medal in the triples with Mohd Amir Mohd Yusof and Azwan Shuhaimi at the 2008 World Outdoor Bowls Championship in Christchurch.

He won a fours gold medal and a triples bronze medal at the 2009 Asia Pacific Bowls Championships in Kuala Lumpur and in 2007, he won the gold medal in the pairs event at the 2007 Southeast Asian Games in Nakhon Ratchasima.

References

1985 births
Malaysian male bowls players
Living people
Southeast Asian Games medalists in lawn bowls
Southeast Asian Games gold medalists for Malaysia
Competitors at the 2007 Southeast Asian Games